The Bangladeshi cricket team toured New Zealand from December 2016 to January 2017 to play two Test matches, three One Day Internationals (ODIs) and three Twenty20 International (T20Is). New Zealand won both the ODI and T20I series 3–0 and won the Test series 2–0.

Squads

Mushfiqur Rahim suffered a hamstring injury in the first ODI and as a result, he was ruled out of the remaining ODI and T20I matches. He was replaced by Nurul Hasan. Jeetan Patel was added to New Zealand's squad for the third ODI. Martin Guptill suffered a hamstring injury during the third ODI match and was ruled out of the T20I series. He was replaced by Neil Broom. Broom was later ruled out because of a fractured finger which he sustained during the first T20I and was replaced by George Worker. Luke Ronchi suffered an injury in the second T20I and was replaced by Tom Blundell. Mushfiqur Rahim, Imrul Kayes and Mominul Haque were all ruled out of the second Test due to injury. Tamim Iqbal was selected as captain in place of Mushfiqur with Nurul Hasan and Najmul Hossain Shanto also added to the squad.

Tour match

50 over match: New Zealand XI v Bangladeshis

ODI series

1st ODI

2nd ODI

3rd ODI

T20I series

1st T20I

2nd T20I

3rd T20I

Test series

1st Test

2nd Test

References

External links
 Series home at ESPN Cricinfo

2016 in Bangladeshi cricket
2016 in New Zealand cricket
International cricket competitions in 2016–17
Bangladeshi cricket tours of New Zealand